Elisabeth, Princess of Anhalt-Bernburg (née Countess Elisabeth of Palatinate-Zweibrücken; 22 March 1642 – 18 April 1677) was the consort of Victor Amadeus, Prince of Anhalt-Bernburg.

Biography 
Countess Elisabeth of Palatinate-Zweibrücken was born in Meisenheim on 22 March 1642 to Frederick, Count Palatine of Zweibrücken and Anna Juliane of Nassau-Saarbrücken. She was a member of the House of Palatinate-Zweibrücken, a cadet branch of the House of Wittelsbach.

On 16 October 1667 she married Victor Amadeus, Prince of Anhalt-Bernburg in Meisenheim, becoming the Princess Consort of Anhalt-Bernburg. They had six children:
Karl Frederick, Prince of Anhalt-Bernburg (b. Bernburg, 13 July 1668 - d. Ballenstedt, 22 April 1721).
Lebrecht, Prince of Anhalt-Zeitz-Hoym, later Anhalt-Bernburg-Schaumburg-Hoym (b. Bernburg, 28 June 1669 - d. Bad Ems, 17 May 1727).
Sophie Juliane (b. Bernburg, 26 October 1672 - d. Bernburg, 21 August 1674).
John George (b. Bernburg, 14 February 1674 - killed in battle at Leuze, 9 September 1691).
Christian (b. Bernburg, 15 March 1675 - d. Bernburg, 30 December 1675).
A son (b and d. Bernburg, 18 April 1677).

Elisabeth died during the birth of her sixth child, whom also died during the birth. She is buried in the crypt of the Castle Church of St. Aegidien.

References 

1642 births
1677 deaths
Burials at Schlosskirche St. Aegidien (Bernburg)
House of Palatinate-Zweibrücken
German countesses
Princesses by marriage
Princesses of Anhalt-Bernburg
People from Bad Kreuznach (district)
Daughters of monarchs